The Shenkeng Old Street is an old street in Shenkeng District, New Taipei, Taiwan.

History
In the 1980s, local residents campaigned against the demolition of the buildings along the street as part of the proposed road widening and redevelopment project. In 2010, a large-scale restoration project began. The management committee of the old street was established in 2014. In 2013, a regulation regulating the management of the old streets in New Taipei was enacted, enabling the committee to collect funds to preserve the heritage buildings of the old street.

Features
The street is famous for its tofu-related food, such as tofu gourmet, tofu snacks and tofu popsicle from various types of tofu.

Transportation
The street is accessible by taxi from Muzha Station of Taipei Metro.

See also
 List of roads in Taiwan
 List of tourist attractions in Taiwan

References

Streets in Taiwan
Transportation in New Taipei